Qarujenag (also Romanized as Qarūjenag; also known as Qūrūchnak and Qūrūch Nak-e ‘Olyā) is a village in Kanduleh Rural District, Dinavar District, Sahneh County, Kermanshah Province, Iran. At the 2006 census, its population was 39, in 10 families.

References 

Populated places in Sahneh County